Lakeville is a town in Penobscot County, Maine, United States. The population was 104 at the 2020 census.

Geography

Demographics

2010 census
As of the census of 2010, there were 105 people, 55 households, and 32 families living in the town. The racial makeup of the town was 95.2% White, 2.9% Asian, and 1.9% from two or more races.

There were 55 households, of which 12.7% had children under the age of 18 living with them, 56.4% were married couples living together, 1.8% had a male householder with no wife present, and 41.8% were non-families. 30.9% of all households were made up of individuals, and 12.7% had someone living alone who was 65 years of age or older. The average household size was 1.91 and the average family size was 2.34.

The median age in the town was 59.3 years. 9.5% of residents were under the age of 18; 2% were between the ages of 18 and 24; 12.5% were from 25 to 44; 47.6% were from 45 to 64; and 28.6% were 65 years of age or older. The gender makeup of the town was 59.0% male and 41.0% female.

2000 census
As of the census of 2000, there were 63 people, 33 households, and 16 families living in the town. The population density was 1.1 people per square mile (0.4/km2). There were 361 housing units at an average density of 6.2 per square mile (2.4/km2). The racial makeup of the town was 93.65% White, 3.17% Native American, and 3.17% from two or more races. Hispanic or Latino of any race were 1.59% of the population.

There were 33 households, out of which 9.1% had children under the age of 18 living with them, 45.5% were married couples living together, 3.0% had a female householder with no husband present, and 48.5% were non-families. 27.3% of all households were made up of individuals, and 15.2% had someone living alone who was 65 years of age or older. The average household size was 1.91 and the average family size was 2.24.

In the town, the population was spread out, with 7.9% under the age of 18, 4.8% from 18 to 24, 15.9% from 25 to 44, 52.4% from 45 to 64, and 19.0% who were 65 years of age or older. The median age was 51 years. For every 100 females, there were 110.0 males. For every 100 females age 18 and over, there were 114.8 males.

The median income for a household in the town was $15,625, and the median income for a family was $16,250. Males had a median income of $23,750 versus $26,250 for females. The per capita income for the town was $14,723. There were 28.6% of families and 40.4% of the population living below the poverty line, including 100.0% of under eighteens and 46.7% of those over 64.

References

Towns in Penobscot County, Maine
Towns in Maine